KFXE 96.5 FM is a radio station licensed to Ingram, Texas. The station broadcasts a country music format and is owned by Lyndell Grubbs, through licensee Radio Ranch, LLC.

KFXE began broadcasting in 2007 and held the call sign KEVE. In July 2008, the station changed its call sign to KSYY and the station aired a hot adult contemporary format as Sunny 96.5. In September 2013, the station adopted the call sign KKGN, and began airing its current Country music format as 96 Gun. On April 13, 2016, the station changed its call sign to the current KFXE.

References

External links

Country radio stations in the United States
Radio stations established in 2007
FXE (FM)
2007 establishments in Texas